Death Duel is a 1977 Hong Kong wuxia film directed by Chor Yuen under the Shaw Brothers Studio banner. The film stars Derek Yee (whose role as the third master launched his career), Ling Yun, and marked the debut of Candice Yu for Shaw Studio where she plays a prostitute. The film based on the Gu Long's novel of the same name. It was remade in 2016 as Sword Master, directed by Derek Yee.

Plot 
The Third Master is considered to be the greatest sword master of the day but he leaves his clan when he sees the wrongs of his father and the greed of his fiancé. Ending up as the lowest at a brothel and living as Useless An, he cannot shake his past. He tries to protect a lowly prostitute and her poor but happy family but only brings them sorrow. His greatest rival, sick from years of abuse to his body and soul and thinking the third dead, begins digging his own grave in the same town. In trying to help he brings an evil army to the town.

Cast

Derek Yee as Third Master Chi
Ling Yun as Yen Shih-san
Candice Yu as Hsiao Li
Ku Feng as Miao Tzu, Hsiao Li's brother
Ouyang Sha-fei as Hsiao Li's mother
Chen Ping as Mu-yung Chiu-ti
David Chiang as Mu-yung Chien-lung
Norman Chui as Mu-yung family swordsman
Ku Kuan-chung as one of the Yu Mien brothers
Ngai Fei as one of the Yu Mien brothers
Gam Lau as Mrs Han
Fan Mei-sheng as Mute
Teresa Ha as Mute's wife
Yeung Chi-hing as Chief Yang
Lam Fai-wong as Yang Wu
Liu Wai as Chief Yang's assistant
Ching Miao as Keeper Shih Wang-sun
Shum Lo as ferryman for Divine Sword Mansion
Yueh Hua as 'Tu Lang Chun' Chou Yu-feng
Ti Lung as Fu Hung-hsueh
Lo Lieh as Han Tang
Nancy Yen as Yu Cheng
Chan Si-gai as girl bullied at tavern
Lau Luk-wa as teacher at tavern
Lau Wai-ling as Ms. Hua / clothes shop boss
Wang Lung-wei as Tien Hu (Yang's guest)
Wong Pau-gei as Tien Hu's brother (Yang's guest)
Jamie Luk as Tien Hu's brother (Yang's guest)
Chan Shen as Leader of Hei Sha Clan
Corey Yuen as Japanese in Hei Sha Clan
Tino Wong as Japanese in Hei Sha Clan
Ng Yuen-fan as Taoist in Hei Sha Clan / chestnut seller
Tai Gwan-tak as Monk in Hei Sha Clan
Hsu Hsia as Member of Hei Sha Clan
Chui Fat as Member of Hei Sha Clan / Yen's challenger
Kong Chuen as Member of Hei Sha Clan / Chiu-ti's man
Ng Hong-sang as Leader of 4 Swift Swords
Wong Chi-keung as One of 4 Swift Swords
Chik Ngai-hung as One of 4 Swift Swords
Lau Jun-fai as One of 4 Swift Swords/chestnut seller's
Alan Chan as one of 8 Spirit Catchers
Yuen Shun-yi as one of 8 Spirit Catchers
Hao Li-jen as tavern boss
Wang Han-chen as bully at tavern
Lo Wai as bully's thug at tavern
Yuen Biao as bully's thug at tavern
Lee Hang| as bully's thug at tavern
Tang Tak-cheung as bully's thug at tavern
Alan Chui Chung-San as Yen's challenger at Maple Wood
San Kuai as Yen's challenger at Maple Wood / Chief Yan
Yuen Wah as whoremonger who stabs Chi
Fung Ging-man as collies supervisor
Ting Tung as collie
Sai Gwa-pau as mourner/whoremonger
Wong Kung-miu as mourner
Tam Ying as mourner
Cheung Sek-au as brothel worker
Mama Hung as brothel worker
Gam Tin-chue as waiter
Brandy Yuen as extra
Man Man as townsfolk

Reception
Paul of hkcinema.com gave the film four out of five stars, writing, "Death Duel is one of the latter wuxia films featuring the enchanting direction of Chor Yuen."

Reviewer Andrew Saroch of fareastfilms.com gave the film four out of five stars, writing, "Death Duel is a bleak, nihilistic swordplay film that embodies all of the qualities that one expects from a Chor Yuen adaptation of a Gu Long story."

See also 
 Sword Master, 2016 film directed by Derek Yee

References

External links

Death Duel on Hong Kong Cinemagic

1977 action films
1977 films
Hong Kong martial arts films
Wuxia films
Films based on works by Gu Long
Films directed by Chor Yuen
1970s Hong Kong films